The Delhi Town Hall is a landmark building, at Chandni Chowk in Old Delhi. It was the seat of the Municipal Corporation of Delhi (MCD) from 1866 during the British Raj till late 2009, when offices shifted to the new MCD Civic Centre on Minto Road in Central Delhi formally inaugurated in 2010.

History
The construction of the building started in 1860 and was completed in 1863. It is constructed out of yellow-painted brick and stone and carved white stone trim. Besides government offices, the building also had a library and a European club.

Originally a bronze statue of Queen Victoria stood in front of the hall. After independence in 1947, it was replaced with a statue of the Arya Samaj leader Swami Shraddhanand. The original statue now stand in Delhi College of Art premises.

The location is officially termed Ghantaghar after a clock tower that once stood here.

References

Further reading 
 Morris, Jan, with Simon Winchester. Stones of Empire: The Buildings of the Raj. Oxford: Oxford University Press, 2005.

External links 

History of Delhi
Government buildings in Delhi
Government buildings completed in 1863
City and town halls in India
1863 establishments in India
Local government in Delhi